Napoleon High School is a  public high school located in Jackson County, Michigan.  With an enrollment of 432 students, it is classified as a Class C school by the Michigan High School Athletic Association (MHSAA). The school's mascot is the Pirates, and athletic teams compete in the Cascades Conference with Addison, East Jackson, Hanover-Horton, Grass Lake, Michigan Center, Manchester, and Vandercook Lake. Napoleon High School services students from Napoleon and Norvell Townships, as well as outlying areas of Columbia and Grass Lake Townships  as a part of Napoleon Community Schools.

History
The current Napoleon High School building, located at 201 West Ave, was built in 1959.  Prior to that, a building was located across the street, on the current site of Napoleon Middle School.

Renovation

In September 2013, district residents passed a $13.1 bond issue to renovate Napoleon High School. The bond issue allowed for the creation of state of the art science labs, as well as numerous upgrades to facilities including: Renovated Cafetorium (Cafeteria/Auditorium multi-use space), new pitched roof replacing original flat roof, renovated weight room, gymnasium, and band room. The bond also provides for technology upgrades.

Demographics
The demographic breakdown of the 426 students enrolled in 2013-2014 was:
Male - 52.6%
Female - 47.4%
Native American/Alaskan - 0.5%
Asian/Pacific islanders - 0.2%
Black - 1.4%
Hispanic - 4.2%
White - 91.6%
Multiracial - 2.1%

36.4% of the students were eligible for free or reduced lunch.

Academics
Napoleon High School performs higher than the state & county averages on the Michigan Merit Exam. In 2012, Napoleon ranked third in Social Studies proficiency within Jackson County.

Athletics

Sports currently available to Napoleon students include basketball, baseball/softball, cross country, competitive cheer, football, golf, track & field, volleyball, bowling, band, and wrestling. The school is a member of the MHSAA.

State championships
Between 1931, and 1949, 16 state championship cross country meets were held in the state of Michigan; during that time, Napoleon won nine State Championships, and finished second five times.

Notable alumni
Ali Aydar - technology entrepreneur
Brian Stuard - PGA golfer
Patti Poppe - CEO of Pacific Gas and Electric Company

External links

 Napoleon Community Schools Website

References

Public high schools in Michigan
Schools in Jackson County, Michigan